
Włoszczowa County is a unit of territorial administration and local government (powiat) in Świętokrzyskie Voivodeship, south-central Poland. It came into being on January 1, 1999, as a result of the Polish local government reforms passed in 1998.

As of 2019 its total population is 45,137, out of which the population of Włoszczowa is 9,985, and the rural population is 35,152.

Neighbouring counties
Włoszczowa County is bordered by Końskie County to the north-east, Kielce County to the east, Jędrzejów County to the south-east, Zawiercie County to the south-west, and Częstochowa County and Radomsko County to the west.

Administrative division
The county is subdivided into six gminas (one urban-rural and five rural). These are listed in the following table, in descending order of population.

References

 
Land counties of Świętokrzyskie Voivodeship